Francisco Javier López García (born 14 October 1950 in Laredo, Cantabria) is a Spanish retired footballer who played as a midfielder.

Football career
During his early career, López played for Gimnástica de Torrelavega (1967–69), Racing de Santander (1969–70) and Real Betis (1970–82). He appeared in nine La Liga seasons with the last club, amassing totals of 266 games and 25 goals.

In 1976–77, López netted twice in 34 matches to help the Andalusians finish fifth whilst winning the Copa del Rey, a penalty shootout win against Athletic Bilbao where he scored both of his team's goals in a 2–2 regulation time draw. Shortly after, on 21 September 1977, he gained his first and only cap for Spain, playing the last six minutes in a 2–1 away friendly win with Switzerland, but would suffer club relegation at the end of the subsequent campaign.

López retired in June 1984 at almost 34, after one season apiece with RCD Mallorca and Granada CF, both in the second division.

References

External links

1950 births
Living people
People from Laredo, Cantabria
Spanish footballers
Footballers from Cantabria
Association football midfielders
La Liga players
Segunda División players
Tercera División players
Gimnástica de Torrelavega footballers
Racing de Santander players
Real Betis players
RCD Mallorca players
Granada CF footballers
Spain international footballers